We Chase the Waves is the second album by Chicago's Sundowner, the acoustic side-project from Chris McCaughan of The Lawrence Arms. The album was released on August 3, 2010.

Track listing
"In the Flicker" – 3:31
"Araby" – 3:00
"Whales and Sharks" – 2:56
"As the Crow Flies" – 4:16
"Baseball's Sad Lexicon" – 1:36
"All Prologue" - 2:15
"Mouth of a Tiger" – 4:33
"Second Hand" – 1:44
"Jewel of the Midwest" – 3:29
"What Beadie Said" – 3:00

Personnel
 Chris McCaughan (vocals, acoustic guitars)

2010 albums
Asian Man Records